Styposis lutea is a species of comb-footed spider in the family Theridiidae. It is found in Puerto Rico.

References

Theridiidae
Spiders described in 1930